Milan D. Bish (July 1, 1929 – November 5, 2001) was an American diplomat. He was Ambassador of the United States to Barbados, Dominica, St Lucia, Antigua, and St. Vincent, as well as Special Representative to St. Christopher-Nevis-Anguilla from 1981 to 1984, under Ronald Reagan.

Biography
Milan D. Bish was born in Harvard, Nebraska on July 1, 1929. He received a B.A. from Hastings College in 1950. He was President of Mid-Continent Enterprises, a real-estate company, and Bish Machinery Co., Bish and Son Cattle Co., and a highway commissioner for Nebraska. He then joined the Ronald Reagan transition team for the U.S. Department of the Interior before being appointed as Ambassador to Barbados, Dominica, Saint Lucia, Antigua, Saint Vincent, and Special Representative to St. Christopher-Nevis-Anguilla.

References

|-

|-

|-

|-

|-

1929 births
2001 deaths
People from Clay County, Nebraska
Hastings College alumni
Ambassadors of the United States to Barbados
Ambassadors of the United States to Antigua and Barbuda
Ambassadors of the United States to Dominica
Ambassadors of the United States to Saint Lucia
Ambassadors of the United States to Saint Kitts and Nevis
Ambassadors of the United States to Saint Vincent and the Grenadines
Reagan administration personnel
20th-century American diplomats